Stelios Kapsalis (born 23 November 1994) is a Greek professional footballer who plays as a centre-back for Super League 2 club Veria.

Personal life

Kapsalis hails from Nea Tyroloi, Serres.

Honours
Panserraikos
Gamma Ethniki: 2014–15

References

1994 births
Living people
Greek footballers
Football League (Greece) players
Super League Greece 2 players
Gamma Ethniki players
Panserraikos F.C. players
Veria F.C. players
Doxa Drama F.C. players
Rodos F.C. players
Association football defenders
Footballers from Serres
21st-century Greek people